Turbonilla manoloi is a species of sea snail, a marine gastropod mollusk in the family Pyramidellidae, the pyrams and their allies.

Description
The shell grows to a length of 12 mm.

Distribution
This species is found in the Pacific Ocean off the Solomon Islands, Tonga, Vanuatu and Fiji.

References

External links
 To Encyclopedia of Life
 To World Register of Marine Species
 Gastropods.com: Turbonilla manoloi; retrieved: 16

manoloi
Gastropods described in 2010